Zorge is a station on the Moscow Central Circle of the Moscow Metro. It became the 30th station on the line when it opened in November 2016.

Zorge is near the Khodynskoye Pole area in northwestern Moscow. The station's name comes from the name of the street, Ulitsa Zorge, on which the station is situated. Ulitsa Zorge is named for Richard Sorge, a decorated Soviet intelligence officer who served in Nazi Germany and Japan.

Zorg, as well as Panfilovskaya station to the north, provides an out-of-station transfer to Oktyabrskoye Pole station of Moscow Metro's Line 7.

External links 
 mkzd.ru

References

Moscow Metro stations
Railway stations in Russia opened in 2016
Moscow Central Circle stations